The Ruscova is a right tributary of the river Vișeu in Romania. It discharges into the Vișeu in the village Ruscova, near Leordina.

Tributaries
The following rivers are tributaries to the river Ruscova:

Left: Budescu, Lutoasa, Bardi, Cvașnița, Drahmirov
Right: Socolău, Paulic, Pentaia, Repedea

References

Rivers of Romania
Rivers of Maramureș County